The 1896 South Carolina Gamecocks football team represented South Carolina College—now known as the University of South Carolina–as an independent during the 1896 college football season. Led by Richard S. Whaley in his first and only season as head coach, South Carolina compiled a record of 1–3. The team played Clemson for the first time.

Schedule

References

South Carolina
South Carolina Gamecocks football seasons
South Carolina Gamecocks football